Palasdari, also known as Padusdhurree during the British Raj is a popular tourist place and a railway junction on Karjat-Khopoli route of Mumbai Suburban Railway. The name Palasdari is derived from Palas, meaning “tree” and Dari means "Valley" in the Marathi language. It is situated on Karjat-Khopoli State Highway No. 35. Palasdari has a well known Palasdari dam. It is frequented by people from Mumbai, Panvel and Navi Mumbai particularly during rainy season. The whole area is surrounded by waterfalls and greenery during monsoon.

One of the attraction of Palasdari is "Math" of Shree Swami Samarth Maharaj Akkalkot situated in a very beautiful place. It is open for the full day (followers only) on Thursdays, ekadashi, aashadhi ekadashi; otherwise it opens after 4PM.

Ministry of Railways (Central Railways has started work im March 2022 as a Green Field "Gati Shakti" Multi-ModelCargo Terminal. This Mega terminal will give GatiShakti to both inward and outward containerised and non containerised freight traffic.

Palasdari is known for its scenic beauty and rough terrain, thorny bushes are in abundance in Palasdari which can be dangerous to reckless travellers. Palasdari has a number of old temples which date anterior to the British Raj in India.  

In the village, there's a famous waterfall called palasdari waterfall which is amazing example of nature's beauty. The waterfall is not much hard to climb for a basic trekker, but in the rainy season the path becomes difficult to travel due to heavy waves of water.

Palasdari Dam

Palasdari dam is a water body constructed by Indian Railways for the requirement of the adjoining Karjat terminus. This dam is near Palasdari railway station and Palasdari town. It is a very popular picnic spot as well a favourite monsoon gate away. Many farm houses are located nearby. It is situated on Karjat-Khopoli state highway.

Waterfalls of Maharashtra
Raigad district